The Captain James A. Hamilton House is a historic house in San Jose, California. It was built in 1882 for James A. Hamilton, his wife, née Anna Thrum, and their children. Hamilton was a sailor.

The house was designed in the Italianate and Queen Anne architectural styles. It has been listed on the National Register of Historic Places since June 9, 1980.

References

Houses on the National Register of Historic Places in California
National Register of Historic Places in Santa Clara County, California
Italianate architecture in California
Queen Anne architecture in California
Houses completed in 1882